Mário Alberto Domingos Campos (born 29 August 1947 in Torres Vedras) is a former Portuguese footballer who played as a midfielder.

External links 
 
 
 Data at WorldFootball

1947 births
Living people
Portuguese footballers
Association football midfielders
Primeira Liga players
Associação Académica de Coimbra – O.A.F. players
Portugal international footballers
People from Torres Vedras
Sportspeople from Lisbon District